Prasiddha Jung Shah (born 3 June 1989, Kathmandu) is a Nepalese swimmer who competed for Nepal in the men's 50 m freestyle at the 2008 and 2012 Summer Olympics. He was the flag-bearer for Nepal at the 2012 Summer Olympics.

References

External links
 

Swimmers at the 2008 Summer Olympics
1989 births
Olympic swimmers of Nepal
Nepalese male swimmers
Swimmers at the 2012 Summer Olympics
Living people
Sportspeople from Kathmandu
21st-century Nepalese people